The following is the list of venues for the 2023 Pan American Games and 2023 Parapan American Games held in Santiago, Chile and surrounding cities from October 20 to November 5, 2023 and from November 17 to 25, 2023 respectively.

A total of 41 competition venues will be used to stage the sporting events. Various venues across Santiago and various other cities will be used for the games, including Viña del Mar, Valparaíso and Algarrobo. In March 2022, the first venue for the games was officially inaugurated: the field hockey stadium on the National Stadium Grounds. 

In June 2022, organizers revealed the final venue plan consisting of 41 competition venues in four regions of the country: Santiago, Valparaíso, O'Higgins and Biobío.

Venues

Santiago Metropolitan Region

National Stadium Park

12 venues are located in the National Stadium Park cluster.

Cerrillos Bicentennial Park
Three venues are located in the Cerrillos Bicentennial Park cluster.

Peñalolen Park
Three venues are located in the Peñalolen Park cluster.

Standalone venues

A further 13 standalone venues were located in the Santiago Metropolitan region.

Valparaíso Region

Eight venues were located in the Valparaíso Region.

O'Higgins Region
One venue was located in the O'Higgins Region.

Biobío Region
One venue was located in the Biobío Region.

References

2023 Pan American Games
2023 Parapan American Games
Venues of the Pan American Games
Sports venues in Santiago
Venues of the 2023 Pan and Parapan American Games